Gazania rigens (syn. G. splendens), sometimes called treasure flower, is a species of flowering plant in the family Asteraceae, native to coastal areas of southern Africa. It is naturalised elsewhere and is widely cultivated as an ornamental plant.

Description
It is a herbaceous plant that is perennial in South Africa and in the Mediterranean regions, and annual in the gardens of colder regions. It rarely exceeds  and forms tufts, often very abundant. Its leaves all basal, numerous, narrow and more or less lanceolate, usually entire, sometimes pennatilobed. The obverse of the leaves is shiny green, the grayish white lapel.

Like all compounds, gazania flowers in flower heads that are often taken for simple flowers. The capitula are solitary at the end of peduncles just beyond the leaves. Each capitulum is formed by a central disc of tubular flowers, surrounded by ligulate peripheral flowers, whose color is very variable. The orange-yellow flowers are however the most numerous, often with black spots at the base of the ligules. The fruit is an achene, containing several seeds.

Naturalisation
Well adapted to the Mediterranean climate, it is native to South Africa and Mozambique. It has become naturalised on the Mediterranean shores, and in places like the Azores, Australia, New Zealand, the United Kingdom, France, Portugal, California, and Argentina. The generic name of the plant is dedicated to Theodore of Gaza (1398-1478), who translated the botanical works of Theophrastus, from Greek to Latin. It is a weed in the islands of Madeira, Sicily and Sardinia.

In Australia, where it is known as coastal gazania, the species has become naturalised on coastal dunes and roadsides in the Central Coast and Sydney regions of New South Wales as well as the coast of South East Queensland. In South Australia it is found in the southern Mount Lofty area as well as on the Eyre peninsula.

Cultivation
Gazania rigens is grown for the brilliant yellow of its blooms which appear against blue-grey foliage in the late spring and throughout the summer. Plants prefer a sunny position and are tolerant of dryness and poor soils. Quite indifferent to the nature of the soil, it looks especially for the sun, its flower heads closing when it is in the shade or when the weather is overcast, and adapts well to drought. Flowering from March to October in the northern hemisphere, the flowers are however more numerous and larger in the spring. In temperate regions this plant is usually grown as a half-hardy annual, though it can tolerate short periods of frost.

Varieties
The currently recognised varieties are:

G. rigens (L.) Gaertn. var. leucolaena (DC.) Roessler. This variety has grey-white leaves. Its flower heads are yellow, typically without any basal eye-spots. It naturally occurs along the southern coast of South Africa, from Mossel Bay in the west, to Port Elizabeth in the east. In cultivation, this variety is referred to as trailing gazania.G. rigens (L.) Gaertn. var. rigens This variety is distinguished by its large 4- to 8-cm flower heads with yellow or orange rays, each with a basal eye-spot. It is only found in cultivation, where it is known as clumping gazania.
G. rigens (L.) Gaertn. var. uniflora (L.f.) Roessler This variety has leaves that are smooth and green on their upper surface. Its flower heads are yellow, typically without any basal eye-spots. It naturally occurs along the east coast of South Africa, from Knysna in the west, to southern Mozambique in the east. Where its range overlaps with that of G. rigens var. leucolaena, the two varieties often grow alongside each other.

Gallery

See also
 List of Gazania cultivars

References

External links
 
 

rigens
Drought-tolerant plants
Flora of South Africa
Flora of Mozambique
Garden plants of Southern Africa
Groundcovers
Taxa named by Carl Linnaeus